Frank Richard Branch (May 7, 1944 – October 22, 2018) was a Canadian politician.

Branch was born on May 7, 1944 in Bathurst, New Brunswick. A Liberal, he was first elected to the New Brunswick Legislature to the multi-member riding for Gloucester County in the 1970 provincial election  He was re-elected to the legislature for the single member riding of Nepisiguit-Chaleur in 1974, 1978, 1982, 1987 and 1991. He served as speaker from 1987-1991 but was neither elected speaker nor named to the cabinet following the 1991 elections and thus did not run for re-election in 1995.

While retired from politics, he chaired a regional forestry marketing board for eight years before he sought re-election in the new, though largely unchanged, riding of Nepisiguit in 2003, where he defeated incumbent Progressive Conservative Joel Bernard by a margin of nearly 2-to-1.

In October 2005, the North Shore Forest Products marketing board, of which Branch is general manager, was taken under investigation for unspecified reasons. On January 13, 2006, Branch left the Liberal caucus to sit as an independent pending the outcome of the investigation and on March 23, 2006, the Canadian Broadcasting Corporation reported that he had been fired.

He served as chair of the legislature's Public Accounts Committee from the 2003 election until he left the Liberal caucus to sit as an independent.

He did not seek re-election in 2006. He died of cancer in Bathurst, New Brunswick on October 22, 2018 at the age of 74.

References

External links 
 MLA Bios, Government of New Brunswick (pdf)

1944 births
2018 deaths
Deaths from cancer in New Brunswick
New Brunswick Liberal Association MLAs
Independent New Brunswick MLAs
Speakers of the Legislative Assembly of New Brunswick
People from Bathurst, New Brunswick
21st-century Canadian politicians